Luis Alberto Reyes Nuñez (born 19 March 1958) is a retired Honduran football player who is currently the fourth all-time scorer for F.C. Motagua.

Club career
Nicknamed Chito, Reyes played forward from season 1978–79 to 1984–85. He scored three goals in the 1979 league final.

He also managed Motagua in 1999–2000 Clausura winning that season.

International career
Reyes was a non-playing squad member at the 1977 FIFA World Youth Championship. He has also represented his country in 5 FIFA World Cup qualification matches

Honours
 Motagua
 League: 1978–79
 League: 1999–00 C (as manager)

Goals scored
 1976–77: 9 goals
 1977–78: 7 goals
 1978–79: 9 goals
 1979–80: 3 goals
 1980–81: 2 goals
 1981–82: 5 goals
 1982–83: 8 goals
 1983–84: 8 goals
 1984–85: 3 goals

References

1958 births
Living people
Association football forwards
Honduran footballers
Honduras international footballers
F.C. Motagua players
Liga Nacional de Fútbol Profesional de Honduras players
Honduran football managers
F.C. Motagua managers